Colloquial Singaporean Mandarin, commonly known as Singdarin or Singnese, is a Mandarin dialect native and unique to Singapore similar to its English-based counterpart Singlish. It is based on Mandarin but has a large amount of English and Malay in its vocabulary. There are also words from other Chinese languages such as Cantonese, Hokkien and Teochew as well as Tamil. While Singdarin grammar is largely identical to Standard Mandarin, there are significant divergences and differences especially in its pronunciation and vocabulary.

The Singaporean government had previously discouraged the use of Singdarin in favour of Standard Singaporean Mandarin under the Speak Mandarin Campaign (SMC), as it believed in the need for Singaporeans to be able to communicate effectively with other Chinese speakers from mainland China, Taiwan or other Sinophone regions. However, such campaigns have been toned down in recent years in response to push-back by Singaporeans, expressing the uniqueness of Singdarin in Singaporean culture.

Today, Singdarin remains often used and is commonly spoken in colloquial speech in Singapore and occasionally even on local television, and most Chinese-speaking Singaporeans are able to code-switch between Singdarin and Standard Mandarin, likewise with most Singaporeans in general with Singlish and standard Singapore English. Furthermore, most non-Chinese Singaporeans are also generally able to understand or speak Singdarin due to many of its phrases and words being widely used in common parlance throughout Singapore, including words which were initially not of Mandarin origin but subsequently adopted into Singdarin.

Origins

Like its Singlish equivalent, Singdarin evolved because many Singaporean Chinese families come from mixed language environments. For instance, children may be raised in households in which one parent speaks English or Malay while the other speaks Chinese or coming for other Chinese dialects, such as Hokkien or Cantonese. Indian languages such as Tamil were also commonly heard in such environments.

Singdarin has also evolved largely because Singapore is a multi-cultural, multi-ethnic and multi-lingual society. One of the most important policies of the Singaporean government is to foster social cohesion and multi-ethnic harmony, and prevent neglected areas or districts and ethnic enclaves from developing.

Therefore, instead of letting certain ethnic groups to live in isolated communities like they did in the past, the Singapore government encourages the majority of Singaporeans that live in state HDB housing to be a melting pot of Chinese, Malays, Indians and other different ethnicities who speak different languages. This is believed to reduce differences between the diverse linguistic and ethnic groups in Singapore, and to ensure racial harmony.

As the majority of Singaporeans live in such housing environments, which have families coming from various linguistic, racial and ethnic backgrounds, there is a tendency for different languages to be mixed in order to facilitate more effective communication between the different races. In short, it leads to the creation of a hybrid culture (known colloquially as the Singaporean "rojak" culture).

This and the tendency for the Singaporean Chinese people to use the mixed language that they use at home in daily colloquial conversation has since influenced the Mandarin spoken in schools, resulting in "Singdarin" being formed. It was in this environment that Singdarin developed.

Examples of Singdarin dialogue

Below are some examples of Singdarin dialogue spoken amongst some Chinese Singaporeans.

1 Usually the word 'station' is omitted.

English loanwords

The following are the common English loan words used in Singdarin.

Loanwords from other languages

Just like Singlish, certain words used in Singlish are also interchangeably used in Singdarin.

Usage of English technical terms

Since English is the main working and educational language of Singapore, many Chinese Singaporeans are more familiar with the English professional terminology (technical terms) used at work, rather than that of Mandarin. This led to many Chinese Singaporeans tending to mix large numbers of English professional terms into Mandarin at work, instead of using Chinese technical terms. As such, a form of Singdarin spoken at work appears, resulting in some degree of communication barrier at work between the Chinese Singaporeans and the Chinese from China or Taiwan.

Comparison between Singdarin spoken at work in Singapore and Mandarin spoken at work in China is shown below:

See also

Chinese Singaporean
Hokkien influence on Singaporean Mandarin
Languages of Singapore
Singaporean Hokkien
Singaporean Mandarin
Singlish
Standard Singaporean Mandarin

Notes

References

External links
Video Example of Singdarin
Singaporean Mandarin Database – Promote Mandarin Council

Mixed languages
Languages of Singapore
Chinese languages in Singapore
Singaporean culture